The Suquamish are a Native American tribe of the U.S. state of Washington.

Suquamish may also refer to:

 Suquamish, Washington, a census-designated place in Washington state
 Suquamish (motor vessel), a diesel-engined passenger vessel built in 1914
 , a ferry vessel built in 2018

See also
Squamish (disambiguation)